Penumarru railway station (station code:PUMU) is an Indian Railway station, located in Penumarru of Guntur district in Andhra Pradesh. It is situated on Tenali–Repalle branch line and is administered by Guntur railway division of South Coast Railway zone. It is classified as an F-category station in the division.

History 
The Tenali–Repalle branch line, a part of Guntur–Repalel section was constructed by Madras and Southern Mahratta Railway, was opened in 1916.

Structure and amenities 
The station has roof top solar panels installed by the Indian railways, along with various railway stations and service buildings in the country, as a part of sourcing 500 MW solar energy.

See also 
 List of railway stations in India

References 

Railway stations in Guntur district
Railway stations in Guntur railway division
Railway stations on Tenali-Repalle line